Carlsbad High School may refer to:

 Carlsbad High School (California)
 Carlsbad High School (Carlsbad, New Mexico)